Momir Milatović (born 7 September 1955) is a Montenegrin professional basketball coach and former player.

Playing career 
Milatović played for Budućnost Podgorica and Elektrokosovo Priština.

Coaching career

Men's basketball 
Milatović coached Ljubović and Budućnost in Podgorica, Željezničar in Sarajevo, Lovćen, FMP Železnik and Crvena zvezda in Belgrade, Ulcinj, as well as Jolly JBŠ in Šibenik, Croatia. He also coached teams in China.

Women's basketball 
He coached Bečej, Budućnost from Podgorica, Vojvodina from Novi Sad, Jedinstvo Bijelo Polje and Jolly JBŠ from Šibenik, Croatia.

National team coaching career 
Milatović was an assistant coach of Željko Obradović in the national team of Yugoslavia in 1997.

In January 2014, Milatović become a head coach of Montenegro women's national team. He led them at EuroBasket Women 2015 in Hungary and Romania.

Personal life 
His brother, Nikola Milatović, is a basketball coach.

See also 
 List of Red Star Belgrade basketball coaches

References

1955 births
Living people
KK Budućnost coaches
KK Budućnost players
KK Crvena zvezda head coaches
KK FMP (1991–2011) coaches
KK Lovćen coaches
Montenegrin basketball coaches
Montenegrin expatriate sportspeople in China
Montenegrin expatriate basketball people in Croatia
Montenegrin expatriate basketball people in Serbia
Sportspeople from Podgorica